Timothy Mark Pimentel Eigenmann (born March 12, 1983), known professionally as Sid Lucero, is a Filipino television and film actor and model. He won the 31st Gawad Urian Best Actor award for his role in Selda.

Career

Tim's stage name, Sid Lucero, is taken from the main character that his father Mark Gil portrayed in the movie Batch '81. His acting career began in 2004 with the GMA-7 soap opera Hanggang Kailan. He soon landed the lead role in ABS-CBN fantaserye Krystala. At the 24th STAR Awards, he earned a nomination both for Best Actor (Selda) and Best Supporting Actor (Tambolista). His first acting award was given by Golden Screen in Donsol for Best Breakthrough Performance of an Actor.

Sid Lucero and Emilio Garcia tied for the Best Actor award at the July 14-22, 2000 Thessaloniki International Film Festival in Greece, regarding film Selda (The Inmate). He gained prominence as Alfred "Red" Ramirez in the Hit Primetime TV Series Dahil May Isang Ikaw which ran from 2009 to 2010. In 2011, the actor stated he would be changing from ABS-CBN to GMA Network. He signed a 2-year contract to the network with an appearance in epic-drama series Amaya. In 2012, Lucero will be included on GMA Telebabad drama, Legacy. This was the first time to work his cousin Geoff on GMA Network since he transferred from ABS-CBN in 2011 until 2017.

Personal life
He is the son of actors Mark Gil and Bing Pimentel, and is the older brother of Maxine Eigenmann and the younger half-brother of Gabby Eigenmann.

He is the older half-brother of Andi Eigenmann. Award-winning actress Cherie Gil is his aunt, and Award-winning actor Michael de Mesa is his uncle while actors Ryan and Geoff Eigenmann are his cousins; Rosemarie Gil is his grandmother and Eddie Mesa is his grandfather.

He has a daughter named Halo Eve with Bea Lao, the drummer of the General Luna.

Filmography

Films

Television

Awards and nominations

 Golden Duck award for Best Short Narrative at the 2nd New Beijing International Movie Week

Guesting in anthologies
 Maalaala Mo Kaya (ABS-CBN), (1 episode, 2008), as Jeepney Driver and live-in partner of Angelica Panganiban, who after having son with Angelica becomes a womanizer eventually separated getting his son after court decision.
 Maalaala Mo Kaya (ABS-CBN) – 16th Anniversary (1 episode, 27 July 2007), as one of the children of Gina Pareño, on the story of a mother saddled with three psychologically disturbed children.

References

External links
 

1983 births
Filipino male television actors
Filipino male child actors
Filipino people of American descent
Filipino people of German descent
Filipino people of Spanish descent
Filipino people of Swiss descent
Living people
Sid
GMA Network personalities
ABS-CBN personalities
Star Magic
Filipino male film actors